Potter County is the name of several counties in the United States:

 Potter County, Pennsylvania
 Potter County, South Dakota
 Potter County, Texas